School's Out is a BBC television series hosted by Danny Wallace. Based on the premise of school subjects, celebrity contestants are asked questions that they would have been asked at school.

Rounds
The General Knowledge Round – Each contestant is randomly asked four questions on any subject.
The Timetable round – A school timetable is shown, five days with six subjects per day. Contestants pick a day and then one subject in the morning and one in the afternoon. They are then asked a question based on that subject. Five points are awarded for a single subject question and ten points for a double.
The French Oral Round – French teacher Virginie Hopstein asks each contestant individually to answer questions she asks in French. Points out of twenty are awarded afterwards.
The Project Round – A subject is given to the students and three questions are asked. Points are awarded for each question.
The Music Round – Each contestant is given a recorder and has to play a part of a song when asked (from series 2 onwards)
The Quick Fire Round – The overall winner is given a timetable similar to the one in round two. They are given a minute to get from Monday to Friday answering questions correctly to progress. They must answer one double subject along the way.

Episodes

Series 1

Series 2

Matt Dawson is the highest scoring "pupil" ever, scoring 94 out of a possible 100.

External links

2000s British game shows
2006 British television series debuts
2007 British television series endings
BBC television game shows
British panel games
Television series by ITV Studios
English-language television shows
Television game shows with incorrect disambiguation